Thomas Edward Lee (born 3 January 1986) is an English former professional footballer who played as a goalkeeper. He began his career with Manchester United, but was unable to break into the first team and was loaned to Macclesfield Town in 2006. He joined Macclesfield permanently later that year, spending two years there before first joining Rochdale on loan and then Chesterfield on a permanent basis. He played for Chesterfield for nine seasons, appearing in more than 350 matches before his retirement due to a shoulder injury in 2017.

Career

Manchester United
Lee was born in Keighley, West Yorkshire. Playing for local team Oakworth Juniors, he then went to Manchester United as a junior player in 2002. In 2005, he helped United's reserve team win the quadruple. In the 2005–06 season he was loaned to Macclesfield Town for what was originally going to be a month, but was extended to three months.

Macclesfield Town
Lee made his league debut away at Oxford United. During his loan period, Macclesfield boss Brian Horton told the Macclesfield Express: "Tommy has been excellent since joining us in January. I spoke to Tony Coton, United's goalkeeping coach, and Sir Alex Ferguson. Both were happy to extend Tommy's loan spell."

In August 2006, he signed a contract with Macclesfield, arriving on a free transfer from Manchester United.

On 6 January 2007, Lee kept goal for Macclesfield Town against English champions Chelsea at Stamford Bridge. Despite suffering an injury to his arm while making a save from Salomon Kalou, he played on until he was sent off for a foul on Andriy Shevchenko. Macclesfield were already 2–1 down by this point, and conceded another four goals after going down to 10 men.

On 22 March 2008, Lee joined Rochdale on loan from Macclesfield Town and played in Rochdale's Play Off Final appearance at Wembley Stadium against Stockport County. Lee was released by Macclesfield in May 2008, before joining Chesterfield on 1 August on a one-year contract.

Chesterfield
In September 2008, Lee was attacked during a night out in Sheffield and required surgery after his jaw was broken. After returning to action, Lee became a fan favourite at Saltergate.

At the end of the season, Lee won the club's Young Spireites Player of the Season award, before signing a two-year deal to keep him at Chesterfield until June 2011. In May 2011, Lee was offered and signed a two-year extension, keeping him at the club until June 2013. Lee has been a firm favourite with the Chesterfield fans, his popularity easily notable as the goalkeeper picked up the fan-voted Player of the Year Award two years running.

Lee played every minute of the Spireites' championship-winning 2010–11 season. His fine form was rewarded as he was placed in the PFA Team of the Year for that season. In September 2011, Lee was injured in a game against Bury. The side missed him to the extent that without him they began a long series of matches without winning and slumped to the bottom of the League One table.

In January 2012, Lee was named man of the match in both legs of the Football League Trophy Northern Final, helping Chesterfield to a 3–1 win and their first trip to the new Wembley Stadium. In the final on 25 March 2012, Lee helped his team keep a clean sheet in a 2–0 win over the much fancied Swindon Town, making a crucial flying save to tip a header over the bar in the final minutes of the game.

In January 2013 Lee signed a three-year contract keeping him at Chesterfield until 2016.

Tommy Lee again found himself in the League 2 PFA Team of the Year, on the same day he kept a clean sheet against Burton Albion to take the Spireites back to League 1 on 27 April 2014.

On 22 July 2015, Lee signed a two-year contract extension, keeping him at the club until 2018. On 2 January 2016, Lee made his 300th league appearance for the Spireites in a 7–1 victory at home against Shrewsbury Town.

On 6 November 2017, Lee announced his retirement from football with immediate effect, aged 31, due to a recurring shoulder injury.

On 25 July 2018, Lee was honoured with a testimonial match against Wigan Athletic, managed by former Chesterfield manager Paul Cook. Lee started the match and played the opening six minutes before being substituted to a standing ovation. The match finished 1–1.

Coaching career
On 24 August 2018, Lee joined the academy of Sheffield Wednesday as a goalkeeping coach. In August 2020, he moved across the city to join Sheffield United as their academy goalkeeping coach.

Career statistics

Honours
Chesterfield
Football League Two: 2010–11, 2013–14
Football League Trophy: 2011–12

Individual
PFA Team of the Year: 2010–11 League Two, 2013–14 League Two

References

External links

Tommy Lee profile at the Chesterfield F.C. website

1986 births
Living people
Sportspeople from Keighley
Footballers from West Yorkshire
English footballers
Association football goalkeepers
Manchester United F.C. players
Macclesfield Town F.C. players
Rochdale A.F.C. players
Chesterfield F.C. players
English Football League players
Sheffield Wednesday F.C. non-playing staff
Sheffield United F.C. non-playing staff